Congress Hall is a historic hotel in Cape May, Cape May County, New Jersey, United States, occupying a city block bordered on the south by Beach Avenue and on the east by Washington Street Mall.  It is a contributing building in the Cape May National Historic District.

Congress Hall was first constructed in 1816 as a wooden boarding house for guests to the new seaside resort of Cape May; and the proprietor, Thomas H. Hughes, called it "The Big House."  Locals, thinking it too big to be successful, called it "Tommy's Folly." In 1828, when Hughes was elected to the House of Representatives, he changed the name of the hotel to Congress Hall.  It burned to the ground in Cape May's Great Fire of 1878, but within a year, its owners had rebuilt the hotel in brick.

While serving as President of the United States, Franklin Pierce, James Buchanan, Ulysses S. Grant and Benjamin Harrison vacationed at Congress Hall, and Harrison made Congress Hall his official Summer White House.  It thus became the center of state business for several months each year.  John Philip Sousa regularly visited Congress Hall with the U.S. Marine Band and composed the "Congress Hall March", which he conducted on its lawn in the summer of 1882.  

During the 20th century, the Cape May seafront deteriorated.  In 1968 Congress Hall was purchased by the Rev. Carl McIntire and became part of his Cape May Bible Conference.  McIntire's possession of the property preserved the hotel during a period in which many Victorian-era beachfront hotels were demolished for the value of their land.

With the decline of the Bible Conference, Congress Hall fell into a state of disrepair.  The property was partially restored under the guidance of Curtis Bashaw, McIntire's grandson, a restoration begun in 1995 and completed in 2002.  Today, Congress Hall is a fully functioning, high-end resort hotel and part of the Cape Resorts family of hotels.

See also
 Cape May Historic District
 List of residences of presidents of the United States

References

Further reading

 

Buildings and structures in Cape May County, New Jersey
Cape May, New Jersey
Hotel buildings completed in 1879
Hotel buildings on the National Register of Historic Places in New Jersey
National Register of Historic Places in Cape May County, New Jersey
Residential buildings completed in 1816
Resorts in New Jersey
1816 establishments in New Jersey
Articles containing video clips